Fan Ming (December 4, 1914 – February 23, 2010), born Hao Keyong, was a general of the Chinese People's Liberation Army during the Battle of Chamdo, where Tibet was incorporated into the People's Republic of China. He was later a deputy secretary of the Tibet Work Committee set up in Lhasa. While in Tibet, Fan became a close associate of the 10th Panchen Lama. A well-educated man, he assumed control of Tibet's social and economic policies while Zhang Guohua, a political rival, assumed command of the PLA armed forces. Fan Ming died in Xi'an on February 23, 2010.

Notes

References
 

1914 births
2010 deaths
People's Liberation Army generals from Shaanxi
Politicians from Xi'an
Chinese Communist Party politicians from Shaanxi
People's Republic of China politicians from Shaanxi
Political office-holders in Tibet
Victims of the Cultural Revolution
Fudan University alumni
Victims of the Anti-Rightist Campaign